Klukowo may refer to the following places:
Klukowo, Ostrów Mazowiecka County in Masovian Voivodeship (east-central Poland)
Klukowo, Siemiatycze County in Podlaskie Voivodeship (north-east Poland)
Klukowo, Wysokie Mazowieckie County in Podlaskie Voivodeship (north-east Poland)
Klukowo, Pułtusk County in Masovian Voivodeship (east-central Poland)
Klukowo, Greater Poland Voivodeship (west-central Poland)